Party Membership Card is a 1936 Soviet crime drama film directed by Ivan Pyryev.

Plot 
The team of one Moscow plant is joined by Siberians Pavel Kurganov, who is distinguished by his intelligence and diligence, thanks to which he almost immediately becomes a production leader and marries the most productive factory worker Anna Kulikova. It would seem everything is fine, but Pavel is a spy.

Starring 
 Andrei Abrikosov as Pavel Kurganov
 Anatoliy Goryunov as Feodor
 Igor Maleyev as Yasha
 Ada Vojtsik as Anna

References

External links 

1936 films
1930s Russian-language films
Soviet black-and-white films
Soviet crime drama films
1936 crime drama films